The Tsiazompaniry Dam is a buttress dam on the Varahina-South River, a tributary of the Ikopa River, near Tsiazompaniry in the Analamanga Region of Madagascar. The dam was constructed by a French firm in 1956. Water released from the dam supplies a regulated flow to hydroelectric power station at the Antelomita Dam downstream. Efforts to install a 5.25 MW power station at the base of the dam began in 2011.

See also
Mantasoa Dam – on the Varahina North River

References

Dams in Madagascar
Analamanga
Buttress dams
Dams completed in 1956
20th-century architecture in Madagascar